Xyleutes is a genus of moths belonging to the family Cossidae and typical of the tribe Xyleutini.

Many species of Xyleutes are considered as crop or forestry pests. They are stem borers boring the branches and trunks of coffee, teak, eucalyptus, acacia and other forest trees.

Species
A current list for Xyleutes may include:

 Xyleutes altitudinis Viette, 1958
 Xyleutes angasii Felder, 1874
 Xyleutes armstrongi Hampson, 1914
 Xyleutes atrosparsellus Walker, 1863
 Xyleutes auroguttata Herrich-Schäffer, 1854
 Xyleutes benestriata (Hampson, 1904) (Bahamas)
 Xyleutes bimaculata Box, 1931
 Xyleutes bipustulata Walker, 1865
 Xyleutes borneana Roepke, 1957
 Xyleutes boschae Heylaerts, 1892
 Xyleutes castaneus Kenrick, 1913
 Xyleutes castrellus Schaus, 1922
 Xyleutes casuarinae Herrich-Schäffer, 1855
 Xyleutes celebensis Roepke, 1957
 Xyleutes celebesa Walker, 1865
 Xyleutes columbina Lucas, 1898
 Xyleutes columellaris Lucas, 1898
 Xyleutes combustus Kenrick, 1913
 Xyleutes cretacea Butler, 1878
 Xyleutes cretosa Lucas, 1898
 Xyleutes decorata Swinhoe, 1892
 Xyleutes desdemona Dyar & Schaus, 1937 (Brasil)
 Xyleutes dorsipunctellus Schaus, 1922
 Xyleutes duponchelli Newman, 1856
 Xyleutes endothermalis Hampson, 1919
 Xyleutes eucalypti Herrich-Schäffer, 1855
 Xyleutes fusca Swinhoe, 1892
 Xyleutes fuscipars Hampson, 1892
 Xyleutes heinrichi Box, 1931
 Xyleutes incanellus Hampson, 1895
 Xyleutes inclusa Walker, 1856
 Xyleutes insulana Lucas, 1898
 Xyleutes interlucens Lucas, 1898
 Xyleutes jamaicensis Schaus, 1901
 Xyleutes keyensis Strand, 1919  (Maluku islands)
 Xyleutes lanceolatus Zeller, 1881
 Xyleutes lecerfi Viette, 1958
 Xyleutes leucolophus Guérin-Meneville, 1829
 Xyleutes lillianae Lindsey, 1926
 Xyleutes liturata Donovan, 1805
 Xyleutes minutiscripta Lucas, 1898
 Xyleutes murina Herrich-Schäffer, 1858
 Xyleutes nebulosa Donovan, 1805
 Xyleutes nigra Moore, 1877
 Xyleutes nigristigmellus Hampson, 1895
 Xyleutes occultoides Kenrick, 1913
 Xyleutes opposita Walker, 1865
 Xyleutes paleacea Herrich-Schäffer, 1858
 Xyleutes pardalis Dudgeon, 1899
 Xyleutes persona (Le Guillou, 1841) (India, Sri Lanka, South-east Asia to the Solomons, Australia)
 Xyleutes peruanellus Schaus, 1922
 Xyleutes pindarus Fawcett, 1916
 Xyleutes poam (Dyar, 1918) (Mexico)
 Xyleutes punctifera Hampson, 1898
 Xyleutes punctifimbria Walker, 1865
 Xyleutes pustulata Herrich-Schäffer, 1858
 Xyleutes ramamurthyi Yakovlev & Sankararaman, 2021
 Xyleutes secta Lucas, 1898
 Xyleutes simillima Hampson, 1916
 Xyleutes spectabilis Felder, 1875
 Xyleutes squamata Hampson, 1919
 Xyleutes squameus Distant, 1902
 Xyleutes steniptera Hampson, 1916
 Xyleutes striata (Druce, 1901) (Colombia)
 Xyleutes strix (Linnaeus, 1758) (from India, South-east Asia including the Philippines to New Guinea)
 Xyleutes tectorius Swinhoe, 1901
 Xyleutes tempestua Lucas, 1898
 Xyleutes tenebrifera Walker, 1865
 Xyleutes terrafirma Schaus, 1911 (Costa Rica)
 Xyleutes tristis Gaede, 1915
 Xyleutes unilinea Dyar, 1925 (Mexico)
 Xyleutes vinasella Schaus, 1913
 Xyleutes xanthotherma Hampson, 1919 (Peru)
 Xyleutes xuna Dyar, 1937 (Mexico)
 Xyleutes zeuzeroides Walker, 1865

Species placed elsewhere
Previously this was a large genus, with more than 135 species included in some databases, but many of these may now are placed in the genera: 

 Aethalopteryx
 Bergaris
 Brypoctia
 Chalcidica
 Duomitus
 Endoxyla (prev. Luzoniella)
 Epipomponia
 Eulophonotus
 Givira
 Hermophyllon
 Morpheis
 Myelobia
 Panau
 Phragmataecia
 Pseudozeuzera
 Psychonoctua
 Rapdalus
 Roerichiora
 Skeletophyllon
 Somatoxena
 Strigocossus
 Trismelasmos

References

External links
 www.nhm.ac.uk
biodiversityexplorer: List of Vari
Moth of Borneo
ftp.funet.fi

 
Zeuzerinae